The Regierungsbezirk Weser-Ems was the most westerly of the four administrative regions of Lower Saxony, Germany, bordering on the Dutch provinces of Groningen, Drenthe and Overijssel. It was established in 1978 by merging the former regions Osnabrück, Aurich, and Oldenburg. It was formally dissolved by the end of 2004 along with the other Regierungsbezirke of Lower Saxony as part of an effort to optimize the administrative system of the state.

The administrative centre of the Regierungsbezirk Weser-Ems was located in the Staatsministerium building in Oldenburg, a representative governmental complex from the period of the Grand Duchy and later Free State of Oldenburg. The department of educational affairs was based in Osnabrück, the department for financial affairs (Regierungskasse treasurer's office) in Aurich.

Kreise(districts)
 Ammerland district
 District of Aurich
 Bentheim
 District of Cloppenburg
 Emsland district
 District of Friesland
 District of Leer
 District of Oldenburg
 District of Osnabrück
 District of Vechta
 District of Wesermarsch
 District of Wittmund

Kreisfreie Städte(district-free towns)
 Delmenhorst
 Emden
 Oldenburg (city)
 Osnabrück (city)
 Wilhelmshaven

References

Geography of Lower Saxony
Former states and territories of Lower Saxony
States and territories established in 1978
States and territories disestablished in 2004
1978 establishments in Germany
2004 disestablishments in Germany
Former government regions of Germany